When Dream and Day Unite is the debut studio album by American progressive metal band Dream Theater, released on March 6, 1989, through Mechanic/MCA Records. The album is composed mostly of material that originally surfaced during the band's early years as Majesty, and it is the only Dream Theater album to be recorded with their full original lineup. James LaBrie replaced Charlie Dominici as the lead vocalist on all subsequent albums.

History
The band was originally formed in 1985 by John Myung (bass), Mike Portnoy (drums), and John Petrucci (guitar) under the name Majesty, which was inspired by Portnoy's commentary on the ending of "Bastille Day" by Rush. After the band found a keyboardist in schoolmate Kevin Moore, the band hosted auditions and settled on Chris Collins as the lead vocalist.

Majesty recorded The Majesty Demos between 1985 and 1986 but, shortly thereafter, were forced to change their name after another band threatened to take legal action. While touring around New York, Collins left the band, and the band went through many lead singers before settling in with experienced vocalist Charlie Dominici. Still trying to come up with ideas to rename their band, Portnoy's father suggested the name Dream Theater, which was the name of a nearby movie theater. They accepted the name, and eventually signed their first recording contract with Mechanic/MCA. The album was then recorded in mid-1988 at Kajem/Victory Studios in Gladwyne, Pennsylvania, notable for the recording of Operation: Mindcrime by Queensrÿche, and the whole process took three weeks.

With the relatively warm reception of their original demos, the band expected their debut album to be received with much fanfare and buzz, but the album went largely unnoticed by the music industry, and eventually led to Mechanic/MCA cutting their contract ties with the band, resulting in a small club tour for the album exclusively in the New York area. They also produced two promotional singles, "Status Seeker" and "Afterlife", whose remixes and single edits for radio were done by Terry Brown of Rush production fame. Due to tensions within the band and creative differences, Dominici was fired from the band, and they were without a lead singer until late 1990.

15th anniversary performance
On the 15th anniversary of the album, the band performed it in its entirety in Los Angeles. Furthermore, during two additional songs in the encore, special guests Dominici and Derek Sherinian (both now former Dream Theater members) performed along with the rest of the band; however, original keyboardist Kevin Moore did not appear. The entire performance was recorded live and later released on CD and DVD under the title When Dream and Day Reunite through Portnoy's independent label YtseJam Records. The album also featured a live version of "Metropolis—Part I", which was originally from the band's 1992 album Images and Words, and a performance of a B-side from Awake called "To Live Forever", both originally written shortly after the release of When Dream and Day Unite, and played live on the tour for the album.

Critical reception

When Dream and Day Unite did not receive much attention upon release, but due to the commercial success of Images and Words, the album later received critical reviews and criticism from many resources. Robert Taylor of AllMusic remarked an obvious Queensrÿche influence in the band's "progressive metal" music and defined Petrucci and Portnoy "competent musicians", whose "individual styles were not yet refined"; he criticized the "subpar singing, too many metal clichés, and poor production", but added that the album has "enough interesting playing to make it a worthwhile listen for fans of this genre." Canadian journalist Martin Popoff positively reviewed the album which contained "startingly progressive yet very heavy and explosive prog metal", but criticized the "clattery, thin production of Terry Date" and the sound of keyboards and drums.
 
This is the only Dream Theater album that failed to chart on the Billboard 200.

Track listing

Personnel
Dream Theater
Charlie Dominici – vocals
John Petrucci – guitar
Kevin Moore – keyboard
Mike Portnoy – drums, percussion
John Myung – bass

Production
Dream Theater - producers
Terry Date – producer, engineer, mixing
Joe Alexander – engineer, mixing
Brian Stover, Trish Finnegan – assistant engineers
Steve Sinclair – executive producer
Amy Guip – cover art

References

Dream Theater albums
1989 debut albums
Albums produced by Terry Date
MCA Records albums